The siege of Herat was part of the Islamic conquest of Persia which was commanded by Ahnaf ibn Qais.

Background
Caliph Umar (634-644) launched an offensive against the Sassanid Persian Empire in 642, and by 651 the Empire was destroyed. However, parts of Khorasan were held by Sasanian loyalists helped by their Hephthalite allies.

In 651 the mission of conquering Khurasan was assigned to Ahnaf ibn Qais by Abdullah ibn Aamir. Abdullah started to march in 650 from Fars and took a short and less frequent route via Rayy, while Ahnaf then marched north directly to Merv, in present-day Turkmenistan.  Later Ahnaf was sent by Abdullah to lead the vanguard of banu Tamim and 1000 Asawira through Quhistan. The people of Tabasyin later revolted from the caliphate just to be reconquered by Ahnaf who now exacted heavier tool of tax.  Ahnaf continued to advance. At first Herat agreed peace and pay Jizya.

Battle 
In 652, Ahnaf was forced to attack Herat again after the latter was once again revolting. He defeated the ruler of Herat and made a once again made treaty with him. However, the ruler of Herat along with the Karenids and many other natives of Khorasan, later rebelled against the Arabs, but were defeated at the battle of Badghis.

See also
Islamic conquest of Persia
History of Arabs in Afghanistan
Early Muslim conquests
Sassanid Empire

References

652
Battles involving the Hephthalites
Battles involving the Rashidun Caliphate
650s conflicts
Sieges of Herat
Muslim conquest of Persia
Sieges involving the Sasanian Empire